is a 2016 Japanese film directed by Yūki Yamato and based on the manga series of the same name by George Asakura. It stars Nana Komatsu, Masaki Suda, Daiki Shigeoka and Mone Kamishiraishi.

Synopsis
Natsume Mochizuki (Nana Komatsu) is a beautiful teen idol working in Tokyo. She is forced to give up her dream and move to her father's hometown of Ukigumo to help run her ailing grandfather's inn. There, she meets Koichiro Hasegawa (Masaki Suda), a young heir to a wealthy and deeply influential family, and for whom she will quickly start developing a romantic interest that will blossom in a tale of rough, passionate, and dangerous love.

The film calls to question sexuality, adult desires & roles assigned to members of society. The end considers what must occur when violence is used and the impact it has on others. Natsume, who everyone finds very beautiful, is often the desire of boys and men which makes her life dangerous.

Cast
Nana Komatsu as Natsume Mochizuki
Masaki Suda as Kōichirō Hasegawa
Daiki Shigeoka as Katsutoshi Ōtomo
Mone Kamishiraishi as Kana Matsunaga
Ryōhei Shima

Gōichi Mine
Ayumu Itō
Masami Horiuchi
Miwako Ichikawa as Meiko Mochizuki
Mickey Curtis

Production
Drowning Love was shot in Wakayama Prefecture. The Japanese band the Dress Codes were recruited for the movie's theme song, a rerecord of their song titled "Comic Generation".

Reception 

Edmund Lee of South China Morning Post rated the film 2.5/5, saying that the emotions are captured in an "alternately ecstatic and frustrating" fashion, and criticizing the film's decision to anchor the central narrative around the sexual assault scene.

The Member of Parliament Robert-Falcon Ouellette, who viewed the film at the Japanese Embassy in Canada, said “it is a film which should be seen by high school students and discussed in class. The violence pushes questions about what is acceptable and unacceptable in society.”

References

External links

 

2010s Japanese films
Live-action films based on manga